The Game is an American television series created by Mara Brock Akil. A spin-off of UPN's Girlfriends, the series premiered on its successor, The CW, on October 1, 2006.

The series was canceled in May 2009 after three seasons. Viacom's BET Networks would strike a deal with CBS Corporation to develop new episodes of the series, relocating taping of the show from Los Angeles to Atlanta, and announcing its renewal at the April 2010 upfronts. New seasons began airing on BET starting January 11, 2011, with the fourth season premiere drawing 7.7 million viewers, making it the most watched sitcom premiere in cable television history. The show would air for six seasons on BET, being renewed for its final two in 2014, and concluding its run on August 5, 2015.

In May 2021, a revival of the series was ordered by Paramount+ with Robinson and Chanchez returning. The revival series premiered on November 11, 2021, and was renewed for a second season in February 2022.

Premise
For the first five seasons, The Game was centered around Joan Clayton's first cousin, Melanie Barnett (Tia Mowry), who was first introduced in the 2006 Girlfriends episode of the same name. Melanie is a first-year medical school student who has given up an offer of admission to Johns Hopkins University School of Medicine in Baltimore to follow her boyfriend, Derwin Davis (Pooch Hall), to San Diego, against the advice of her parents. Derwin is a first-year rookie American football player with a fictional "San Diego Sabers" team. As Melanie settles into her new life, she meets Tasha Mack (Wendy Raquel Robinson), the mother of Sabers' starting quarterback Malik Wright (Hosea Chanchez), and Kelly Pitts (Brittany Daniel), the then-wife of Sabers' captain Jason Pitts (Coby Bell), who warn her to keep a close eye on her boyfriend because of the numerous "gold diggers" who approach the professional American football players. As Melanie learns to balance her new roles as both med student and the partner of a professional American football player, the series focuses on the evolving relationships between the players and their significant others.

Episodes

Cast

Main cast
 Tia Mowry-Hardrict as Dr Melanie Barnett-Davis, M.D. (seasons 1−5; guest season 9) - Melanie is the show's main protagonist. In season one, Melanie is a medical student who gave up the chance to attend Johns Hopkins School of Medicine to move to San Diego with her boyfriend Derwin Davis while attending a less prestigious medical school in the area. Melanie is the cousin of Los Angeles attorney-turned-restaurateur Joan Clayton (of Girlfriends). In season one, Melanie and Derwin break up due to Derwin's infidelity with singer Drew Sidora, which starts a series of ups-and-downs between the two. In the season three finale, Melanie finally marries Derwin during a private ceremony, after the public ceremony was interrupted by the birth of Derwin's son by his ex-girlfriend Janay. In season five, after confessing that she felt empty being just a housewife despite their wealth and Derwin's success, she decides to pursue her medical career and begin a residency program at Johns Hopkins School of Medicine. Derwin was against it at first but eventually came around. In May 2012 Mowry announced via her Twitter account that she would not be returning to The Game in season six. In the series finale, Melanie made an appearance in where she was pregnant with her & Derwin's twin babies and as the episode closes it's shown that she has had a boy and girl. She did not appear in Season 6, Season 7 and Season 8.
 Pooch Hall as Derwin Davis (seasons 1−5; guest seasons 6 and 9) - Derwin  is a wide receiver for the San Diego Sabers and husband of Melanie Barnett. In the season one finale, Derwin has an affair with Drew Sidora, and Melanie breaks off the relationship. In the beginning of season 2, after desperately trying to get her back, Derwin acts out against Melanie for a bit until she saves him from a gold digger who tried to "trap" him by getting her pregnant. Derwin and Melanie became cordial for a minute as they both went about their own way & were seeing other people, but a run-in at a grocery store and later at Derwin's apartment on the day of the Super Bowl stirred up their old feelings of love again, as the two passionately kiss upon sight the second time. The off field drama didn't affect Derwin's play on the field though, as he became a rising star for the Sabers until he suffered a bad knee injury in a playoff game. In the season two finale, he finds out his ex-girlfriend Janay is pregnant with his baby, and he and Melanie get back together. Derwin ran into some on the field issues (due to his injury, the Sabers considered cutting him for a little while) and off the field issues throughout season 3 (questions about whether he was actually the father of Janay's baby, Melanie and Janay feuding, getting with Melanie but not being all in, Melanie breaking up then getting back with him while having an affair with a handsome doctor, Derwin breaking up and then trying to get with Janay only for the baby's sake, and finally breaking up with Janay and proposing to Melanie). In the season three finale, Derwin's son is born and he finally marries Melanie in a private ceremony. In the fourth-season premiere, there are still some questions regarding the true paternity of Derwin's son. Derwin also emerges as a superstar player in season 4, getting numerous endorsement deals, including Nike, and becoming the new face of the Sabers organization. In May 2012, it was announced that Hall would not return to The Game for the sixth season; however in August 2012 it was announced that he would be returning, but Hall would only appear in one episode. In season 6, Derwin was traded to Baltimore in exchange for Blue and he is the enemies of Bryce "Blue" Westbrook, who was chosen by Baltimore as the Number 1 Draft Pick. This allowed Derwin to be with Melanie, who is in Baltimore doing her Residency. The trade, however, was not planned by Derwin, but executed by the team owner because Derwin was responsible for the injury of former teammate and quarterback Kwan Kirkland. In the series finale of season 9, Derwin made an appearance with a pregnant Melanie as the episode closes it's shown that they've had a baby boy & girl. He did not appear in Seasons 7 and 8.
 Wendy Raquel Robinson as Tasha Mack - Tasha is the brash, bold, & flamboyant mother of Malik Wright and begins the series as his manager. Malik, giving his mother an ultimatum at one point, eventually fires Tasha. It is then that Tasha builds her own management company, Tasha Mack Management. She dissolves the company, however, to join Irv Smiff Management (ISM). In season three, she falls in love with former NBA player Rick Fox, who also works for ISM. Tasha ends up getting fired from ISM, and dumps Rick in the aftermath, assuming that he knew all about Irv Smith's plans to fire her.  In the season three finale, Kelly Pitts and Tasha have a falling-out when Kelly discovers that Tasha set her then ex-husband, Jason Pitts, with his then new girlfriend, Camille. The altercation soon turns physical, with Kelly punching Tasha. Season four started with Tasha as Derwin's agent. She had also begun dating a much younger man named Donté (played by former 106 & Park host Terrence J). In season 5, Tasha decided to be celibate after a brief romance with a male escort (Carl Anthony Payne). She eventually falls for her longtime friend Pookie (Rockmond Dunbar). In the Season 5 finale, her ex-boyfriend Rick Fox returns. In season 6, she appoints herself Sunbeams president due to Jaz arguing with everybody with Tasha and Keira and Chardonnay. At the end of season 7, after breaking up with Pookie (upon Pookie finding out about her affairs with Rick) and later with Rick, she becomes pregnant & delivers a baby girl by Pookie. In the series finale, after revealing the feelings they still had for each other Tasha & Pookie decided to be together & happily moved into their own house with their baby daughter.
 Brittany Daniel as Kelly Pitts (seasons 1–3 and 9; recurring seasons 4 and 7–8) – Kelly Pitts is the wife of Jason Pitts, mother of Brittany Pitts, and former President of the Sunbeams. After their relationship gradually becomes more and more strained in season 2, Kelly and Jason divorce at the beginning of season three. At the start of season 4, it is revealed that Kelly is now a reality TV star, with her own show centered around the ex-wives of professional athletes. Her character was bumped down to recurring in season 4, and her character was effectively written out of the show in season 4 after she stated to Jason that she needed to head back home to her parents to find herself again. Daniel had made no further appearances in the series after that season. But in season 6, Kelly is heavily mentioned by the remaining characters (especially Tasha). After being referred to a therapist by Kelly, Tasha reveals that Kelly has since moved to Paris. She made her return in season 7. She comes to Chardonnay and Jason's wedding where Jason reveals he still loves her, ending the wedding. She and Jason get remarried in season 9.
 Hosea Chanchez as Malik Wright – Malik Wright is the San Diego Sabers superstar quarterback and the son of Tasha Mack. Arrogant and cocky, Malik initially begins the series as an immature womanizer. He falls in love with actress Robin Givens and convinces her to marry him as a publicity stunt. In the beginning, he lived with his mom but eventually gets his own place for the purpose of being able to party every night. He also fired his mom in season 2. In the season 3, he finally meets his father and his half sister, Pucci, whom he tries to help with her singing career. In season 4, Malik is still a cocky, spoiled playboy who is sleeping with the wife of the Sabers' new owner (guest star Meagan Good). Malik gets incarcerated for assaulting a cop and DUI, and goes to rehab to solve his newfound problems. In rehab, he falls for a troubled supermodel Jenna Rice (Tika Sumpter). In season 5, Malik has financial issues and is forced to sell his multimillion-dollar mansion and his cars. The season 5 finale, Malik ends his relationship with Jenna. He seemed to be getting his life together, but then had converted back to his old ways. During the season 6 finale, after Malik lands in the hospital from being beat up by a group of men, he learns he won't have full use of his football arm anymore. In season 7, Malik goes through physical therapy in hopes of getting back into American football and falls for his previously lesbian physical therapist Yanna. In the season 7 finale Malik ends his relationship with Yanna. In season 8 Malik rejoins the Sabers, but loses his position as team captain to Blue. In the season 8 finale he and Keira admit their feelings about each other (after being best friends for a long time). In the beginning of season 9 Malik and Keira are in a relationship as he and Blue began feuding, and he becomes the laughing stock of the team . Then, in the next to last episode, Malik breaks up with Keira after realizing he wasn't truly in love with her the way he was with Yanna.(Malik determined this after realizing he wasn't crying after having sex with Keira like he did with Yanna, something he had never felt before then.) Keira responds by slapping him. In the series finale Malik leads the team to the playoffs, he proposes to Keira (who declines), he had plans to retire, but he continues to play, winning another championship with the Sabers.
 Coby Bell as Jason Pitts (seasons 1–3 and 6–9; recurring seasons 4–5) – Jason is a San Diego Sabers former team captain and superstar wide receiver, later its head coach.  He is the husband of Kelly Pitts, although they divorced in season 3.  Jason and Kelly have one child, Brittany Pitts. In season 2, realizing that his skills were visibly diminishing, Jason starts using steroids to boost his performance. The Sabers win the championship that year. But once Kelly finds out about his steroid use it puts a strain on their relationship, leading to their divorce in season 3. Jason had a girlfriend briefly in season 3 (guest star Stacey Dash); however, he is single at the beginning of season 4. Jason is officially cut from the Sabers in season 4, and he becomes a correspondent on Benched, a sports news television series hosted by former NBA basketball player Chris Webber. In season 5, he is a correspondent on his own show, The Pitts Stop, and is in a romantic relationship with girlfriend-wife Chardonnay (portrayed by Brandy Norwood). In season 6, Jason makes an attempt at a comeback but suffered a concussion, affecting his playing ability among other things as well. He retires for good at the beginning of season 7. In season 7 Kelly returns and attends the wedding of Chardonnay and Jason (at Chardonnay's request). Jason does not marry Chardonnay, admitting he is still in love with Kelly. In season 8 Jason courts Kelly again (despite her initial reluctance) and is also named interim head coach of the Sabers. He and Kelly remarry in season 9.
 Brandy as Chardonnay Pitts (seasons 6–9; recurring season 5) – Chardonnay Pitts is the ex-wife of Jason Pitts. She and Jason meet when he goes to the bar where she bartends. She refuses to serve Jason, who tells her boss and gets her fired. Feeling bad after he got her fired, Jason takes her on a date. They wind up in Tijuana. Jason gets drunk and Chardonnay tricks him into marrying her to see if he really loves black women. They return to San Diego and decide to get their marriage annulled. In the season 5 finale Chardonnay and Jason decide not to go through with the annulment and stay married. Though they have their ups and downs, everything seems fine between the two until Kelly shows up in season 7. Kelly pays off Ty Savage (Jason's former teammate) to stop him from revealing Jason's steroid use. This upsets Chardonnay to the point that she kicks Jason out of the house. She lets him back in and despite his reveal that he kissed Kelly after visiting her in a hotel, they still plan to get married. But in the season 7 finale, Jason doesn't go through with the wedding, revealing he's still in love with Kelly. Chardonnay slaps Jason and storms off, beside herself. At the beginning of season 8 she goes back to Fresno, saying to Tasha there is nothing left but bad memories in San Diego.
 Lauren London as Keira Michelle Whitaker (seasons 6–9) – Keira is a former child star who starred in a fictional 'Cosby'-esque sitcom called Stuck Together. She is struggling to make the transition from child star to adult. Keira is one of the new characters introduced in season 6. Her character does not replace Melanie, but is a new character added into the script. Her love interest is "Bryce 'Blue' Westbrook". The two meet at a party where they hook up. After being shut down by Keira, Blue hooks up with Keira's friend, singer Ciara, making Keira jealous. Blue and Keira try to ignore and anger each other at first, then become cordial, then fall for each other. After Keira loses her virginity to Blue however, they break up due to Blue's insensitivity. They still have feelings for each other even while Keira briefly dates an actor named Luke, with whom she has a rather raunchy sex scene in her movie 'Baggers', that she didn't want Blue to see at the premiere. (He sees it from the back.) They break up again. After more ups and downs in season 7, they elope in that season's finale after Blue proposes, skipping Jason and Chardonnay's wedding. In season 8, after being told by several people that she needs to dedicate herself to her craft, she kisses Malik at an audition after being made to by the acting coach, leading to deeper feelings between the two, who were just best friends before. Blue catches on & breaks off the engagement in season 9 after a huge fight between him and Malik in an elevator. Keira ends up with Malik, at the disapproval of Tasha. In the series finale, after Malik breaks up with Keira, she sleeps with Blue once more, refuses Malik's proposal & she decides to focus on her career. She gets her breakout role.
 Jay Ellis as Bryce "Blueprint" Westbrook (seasons 6–9) – Bryce is a San Diego Sabers wide receiver and the first overall draft pick from Stanford who is highly educated and often the smartest person in the room. Even though he is bright and talented, he is still a young man who has a lot to learn about life, love and himself. Blue is one of the new characters that was introduced in season 6. His character replaces Derwin Davis as a main character. Blue was traded from Baltimore to San Diego in exchange for Derwin. The two men confront each other at a post-draft party and brawl. That same night he pursues Keira for the first time. They start an on-again, off-again type of relationship throughout the series. Though Blue had his moments where he attempts to act out against Keira when the two weren't together by using women to make her jealous (sleeping with Ciara, bringing her to a group photoshoot, & the party bus episode all in season 6, having an escort with him in the season 7 premiere, having a woman with him in season 9 as he calls off their engagement), he obviously still loves Keira. In season 7 Jason chastises Blue for not being focused due to his off the field distractions. Blue takes initiative and eventually  becomes team captain in season 8. In season 9 he led a protest against Saber management that cost him a couple of games, though the Sabers would eventually win the championship in the series finale.

Current Recurring cast
 Barry Floyd as Terrence "Tee-Tee" Carter - Malik's childhood friend, former assistant, and owner of Tee Tee's Cluck Truck.

 Rockmond Dunbar as Pookie - Ex-con; Tasha's old friend and eventual love interest. He is the father of Tasha's newborn baby. It is revealed his real name is Marion.

Previous Recurring cast
 P. J. Byrne as Irv Smiff - Owner of Irv Smiff Management (ISM). (Seasons 1–3, 5, 9)
 Bumper Robinson as Juvon Glenn - San Diego Sabers' Running Back and husband of Jazz. (Seasons 1, 3–6, 8-9)
 Shanti Lowry as Dionne Marie Taylor - Derwin's former publicist and Melanie's previous roommate. (Seasons 1–3, 8)
 Gregory Alan Williams as Dr. James Barnett - Melanie's father. (Seasons 1, 3-4)
 Claudette Roche as Grace Barnett - Melanie's mother. (Seasons 1, 3-4)
 Tahj Mowry as Cameron Barnett - Melanie's brother. (Season 1, 3)
 Drew Sidora as herself — singer; Derwin's brief love interest. (Seasons 1-2)
 Rocky Carroll as Kenny "Coach T" Taylor - offensive coordinator of the San Diego Sabers; Tasha's brief love interest. (Seasons 1-2)
 Caryn Ward as Erica Harrison (Seasons 1–4, 8)
 Kendra C. Johnson as Renee Royce - TV personality and one of Malik's love interests. (Seasons 1-2)
 Chaz Lamar Shepherd as Trey Wiggs - Melanie's college friend and father of Melanie's aborted baby. (Seasons 1–2, 5)
 Rick Fox as himself — former NBA basketball player; Tasha's co-worker and eventual love interest. (Seasons 2–3, 5–6, 9)
 Robin Givens as herself — actress; Malik's ex-wife. (Seasons 2-3)
 Tae Heckard as Jasmine "Jazz" - the former Sunbeams President and Wife of San Diego Sabers' Running Back Juvon (Seasons 2–6, 8-9)
 Gabrielle Dennis as Janay Brice - Derwin's ex-girlfriend and mother of his son. In season 5, it was revealed that she is engaged to a man named Noah and decided to take her son DJ and move to New York with her fiancé. (Seasons 2-5)
 Lee Majors as Coach Ross - coach of the San Diego Sabers. (Seasons 2-3)
 Mehcad Brooks as Jerome - Melanie's ex-boyfriend. (Seasons 2-3)
 Jason Olive as McHottie - Melanie's love interest in medical school. (Season 3, 5)
 Michael Boatman as Lawrence Chauncey Wright - Malik's father. (Season 3)
 Lisa Tucker as Pucci Wright - Malik's half-sister. (Season 3)
 Stacey Dash as Camille Rose - Jason's ex-girlfriend. (Seasons 3-4)
 Michael Beach as Roger Keith - Owner of San Diego Sabers. (Seasons 4–6, 8-9)
 Terrence Jenkins as Donté - the younger ex-boyfriend of Tasha. (Season 4)
 Chris Webber as himself — former NBA basketball player; Jason's co-host on the sports news television series Benched. (Season 4)
 Tika Sumpter as Jenna Rice - Super Model; Malik met Jenna in Rehab; later Malik's love interest. (Seasons 4-5)
 Meagan Good as Parker Keith - The wife of Roger Keith; had an affair with Malik. (Season 4)
 Jigga as Bibs - Malik's bodyguard. (Seasons 4-9)
Isley Anderson as D.J. - Derwin and Janay's son (Seasons 4–5, 9)
 Charles Michael Davis as Kwan Kirkland - the San Diego Saber's former quarterback. (Seasons 4-5)
 Janet Varney as Summer Grayson - co-host of The Pitts Stop. (Season 5)
 Ciara as Herself — singer; friend of Keira; she hooked up with Blue. (Season 6)
 Candice Patton as Tori - Malik's personal assistant. (Seasons 6-7)
 LaMonica Garrett as Luke Rogers (Season 6)
 Miranda Rae Mayo as Patreece Sheibani (Season 6)
 Carissa Capobianco as Nina - Malik's girlfriend; friend of Keira. (Seasons 6-7)
 Hayley Marie Norman as Bianca (Season 6)
 Danielle Nicolet as Yana - A physical therapist who agrees to help Malik recuperate from his injured arm. (Season 7-9)
 Andra Fuller as Roger Keith Jr. - The son of Sabers owner Roger Keith. (Seasons 9)
 Richard Gant as  Walter Mack - Tasha Mack's father, Malik's Grandfather (Season 6-7, 9)

Special guest appearances

 Jared Allen
 Tichina Arnold
 Nnamdi Asomugha
 Rob Base
 Garcelle Beauvais
 Chico Benymon
 Derek Blanks
 Tisha Campbell-Martin
 Chamillionaire
 Morris Chestnut
 Terry Crews
 Loretta Devine
 Dustin Diamond
 Christopher B. Duncan
 Earthquake 
 Selita Ebanks
 Raymond Edwards, Jr.
 David Eigenberg
 Carmen Electra
 Estelle
 Eve
 Faith Evans
 Fabolous 
 Melyssa Ford
 Scott Michael Foster
 Vivica A. Fox 
 Andy Allo
 Tomiko Fraser 
 Kevin Frazier  
 Rudy Gay
 Cuba Gooding, Jr.
 Kelsey Grammer
 Tiffany Haddish
 Irma P. Hall
 Regina Hall
 Cory Hardrict
 Hill Harper
 Napoleon Harris
 Jamie Hector
 Jim Hill
 Djimon Hounsou
 Daymond John
 Magic Johnson  
 Shawn Johnson
 Mike Jones
 Leslie Jordan 
 Gayle King 
 Solange Knowles
 Queen Latifah
 Martin Lawrence
 NeNe Leakes 
 Lisa Leslie
 LisaRaye
 Lil Scrappy
 Lil' Kim
 Nia Long
 Eva Marcille
 Shawn Marion
 Penny Marshall
 Duane Martin
 Darius McCrary
 Willie McGinest
 Lonette McKee
 Romeo Miller
 Daryl Mitchell
 Kel Mitchell
 Mo'Nique
 Tahj Mowry  
 Bria Murphy
 Musiq
 Navid Negahban
 Elimu Nelson
 Chad Ochocinco
 Terrell Owens  
 Keke Palmer
 Carl Anthony Payne II 
 Mario Van Peebles
 Shaun Phillips
 Eyal Podell 
 Kyla Pratt
 Reagan Gomez-Preston
 Jerry Rice 
 Charlie Robinson
 Jalen Rose
 Kelly Rowland
 Ja Rule
 Ephraim Salaam
 Drew Sidora
 John Singleton
 Kenny Smith
 Tasha Smith
 Soulja Boy
 Keith Sweat
 Nick Swisher
 Raven-Symoné
 Kenan Thompson
 Too Short
 Lisa Tucker
 Michael Twombley
 Gabrielle Union
 Chris Webber
 Serena Williams
 Stevie Williams
 Tyler James Williams
 Vanessa L. Williams
 Kellen Winslow II
 Jaleel White
 Shereé Whitfield
 William Allen Young
 Jolee Alexander
 Jason Momoa
 Destine' Parker

Production

2021 revival series

In May 2021, it was announced that Paramount+ had ordered a revival of the series, with the setting relocated to Las Vegas. Hosea Chanchez, Coby Bell, Brandy, Brittany Daniel, Pooch Hall and Wendy Raquel Robinson were in talks to reprise their roles as Malik Wright, Jason Pitts, Chardonnay Pitts, Kelly Pitts, Derwin Davis and Tasha Mack.

Joining the returning cast was Vaughn W. Hebron as "Jamison Fields", an undrafted free agent; Adriyan Rae as "Brittany Pitts", Jason and Kelly Pitts daughter, (previous portrayed by Katlynn Simone); and Analisa Velez as "Raquel Navarro", Brittany’s best friend. Tia Mowry-Hardrict, who was cast in Netflix's Family Reunion, made a TikTok video expressing that she will most likely not return to her 2 roles of Sister, Sister and The Game. While being honored at the Ebony 'Power 100''', she was interviewed by Entertainment Tonight saying: “You know what’s so funny? Never say never. I mean, as it stands for right now, we aren’t in any talks or communication about me coming back to the show...I know it seems kind of weird, because I’m like, the only one, but you know, Melanie, I loved playing that character, and if everything works out, and if everything works out the way that it should, then who knows? I might be on the show.” 

U.S. ratings
Seasonal ratings based on average total viewers per episode of the series. The fourth season premiere acquired 7.7 million viewers, which was a record for a scripted premiere on BET.

 **The series is marketed and rebranded as a fresh new season on Paramount+, beginning the new inception as Season 1.

Lawsuit
In September 2006, writer Staci Robinson filed a $40 million lawsuit against the CW, CBS, Warner Bros., and Grammnet Productions for copyright infringement. Robinson claimed that she had applied for a job as writer's assistant in 2005 with series creator and executive producer Mara Brock Akil, to whom Robinson had subsequently sent her novel, Interceptions''. The novel is about a woman who decides to put her goal of becoming a lawyer on hold to follow her boyfriend as he pursues a career as a professional American football player.  After receiving the novel, Robinson was interviewed for the job but later declined the position. Robinson alleged that Akil and a CW screenwriter stole the idea from her novel to create the series. The suit was settled out of court under a non-disclosure agreement in September 2007.

Awards and nominations

DVD releases
Season releases

References

External links
 Official website at Paramount+
 
 

2000s American black sitcoms
2000s American comedy-drama television series
2006 American television series debuts
2010s American black sitcoms
2010s American comedy-drama television series
2015 American television series endings
American football television series
American television series revived after cancellation
American television spin-offs
BET original programming
The CW original programming
English-language television shows
Television series created by Mara Brock Akil
Television shows filmed in Atlanta
Television shows filmed in Los Angeles
Television shows set in San Diego
Television series by CBS Studios